Richland is a town in Oswego County, New York, United States. The population was 5,718 at the 2010 census.

The Town of Richland is in the northeastern part of Oswego County.

History 

The town was first settled circa 1801. The Town of Richland was formed from part of the Town of Williamstown in 1807.

Geography

The western border of the town is Lake Ontario.

Demographics

As of the census of 2000, there were 5,824 people, 2,257 households, and 1,543 families residing in the town.  The population density was 101.9 people per square mile (39.3/km2).  There were 2,890 housing units at an average density of 50.5 per square mile (19.5/km2).  The racial makeup of the town was 98.15% White, 0.19% African American, 0.33% Native American, 0.39% Asian, 0.12% from other races, and 0.82% from two or more races. Hispanic or Latino of any race were 0.65% of the population.

There were 2,257 households, out of which 34.4% had children under the age of 18 living with them, 53.2% were married couples living together, 10.5% had a female householder with no husband present, and 31.6% were non-families. 26.1% of all households were made up of individuals, and 12.9% had someone living alone who was 65 years of age or older.  The average household size was 2.57 and the average family size was 3.10.

In the town, the population was spread out, with 27.7% under the age of 18, 7.0% from 18 to 24, 28.9% from 25 to 44, 23.2% from 45 to 64, and 13.2% who were 65 years of age or older.  The median age was 36 years. For every 100 females, there were 97.6 males.  For every 100 females age 18 and over, there were 94.8 males.

The median income for a household in the town was $36,410, and the median income for a family was $43,564. Males had a median income of $36,035 versus $22,337 for females. The per capita income for the town was $16,780.  About 9.6% of families and 13.4% of the population were below the poverty line, including 16.6% of those under age 18 and 13.8% of those age 65 or over.

Communities and locations in Richland 
Bethel Corners – hamlet on NY 3 on the north side of the Salmon River
Daysville – hamlet in southwest part of town
Daysville Corner – location on NY 3 south of Selkirk Shores State Park
Farmers Corner – hamlet on US 11 south of Pulaski
Fernwood – hamlet in southern part of town
Malby Corners – hamlet north of Pulaski
Port Ontario – hamlet on the south side of the Salmon River along NY 3
Pulaski – the village of Pulaski
Ramona Beach – a community on the shore of Lake Ontario
Richland – namesake hamlet in the east part of town
Selkirk – hamlet on the shore of Lake Ontario; site of the Selkirk Light
Selkirk Shores State Park – a state park on the shore of Lake Ontario south of Selkirk
Tinker Tavern Corner – location along US 11 in southern part of town
Tylers Corner – location in south-central part of town

References

External links
1895 History of Richland, NY
RW&O Railroad, Richland, NY

Syracuse metropolitan area
Towns in Oswego County, New York